Sidra Niazi is a Pakistani television actress. Her notable appearances are Qayamat and Chupke Chupke and is currently appearing as a supporting character in Geo Entertainment's Badzaat alongside Imran Ashraf and Urwa Hocane.

Filmography

Television

Telefilm

Short film

References

External links 

21st-century Pakistani actresses
Pakistani television actresses
Living people
Year of birth missing (living people)